Astarqan (also Romanized as Astarqān and Āstarqān; also known as Astarabān, Astaragan, and Astarghan) is a village in Arzil Rural District, Kharvana District, Varzaqan County, East Azerbaijan Province, Iran. At the 2006 census, its population was 157, in 41 families.

References 

Towns and villages in Varzaqan County